George Charles Edward Oliver (15 June 1883 – 6 July 1964) was an Australian rules footballer who played with Melbourne in the Victorian Football League (VFL).

Family
The son of Charles Edward Oliver, and Jane Oliver, née Carson, Norman Maxwell Oliver was born in Carlton, Victoria on 15 June 1883.

His brothers Les and Norm played VFL football with Richmond and Collingwood respectively.

Notes

References

External links 
 
 
 George Oliver, at Demonwiki.

1883 births
1964 deaths
Australian rules footballers from Melbourne
Melbourne Football Club players
People from Carlton, Victoria